Newtown River is a large natural inland harbour located on the Isle of Wight's northwestern coast, named after the nearby village of Newtown. It is sometimes also referred to as Newtown Creek.

Newtown Harbour is the name given by Natural England to the River and surrounding land, and this area is the only national nature reserve on the island. It is owned and managed by the National Trust.

Newtown River consists of a number of estuaries of small rivers, and has the form of several finger-like indentations in the coastline.

The narrow entrance to Newtown River is 3/4 of a mile east of Hamstead Point, in the centre of Newtown Bay. The entrance needs navigating with care as there is a bar across the entrance, strong cross tides and a fair flow of water in and out of the entrance channel at mid-tide. Although, much mud is exposed in the harbour at low water, there are a number of moorings in the deeper parts of the creeks and lakes and the anchorage can become crowded at weekends during the main sailing season.

Scouts from nearby Corf Camp often make use of the Estuary for expeditions from the jetty on the shore.

The harbour is loved for its unspoilt beauty and tranquility. The River and adjoining land are regarded as one of the best examples of an undisturbed natural harbour on the south coast of England with its varied habitats ranging from woodland, ancient meadows, mudflats and marshland. It supports a number of rare species, but its primary importance is as a wintering ground for seabirds.

The River is part of the Isle of Wight's Area of Outstanding Natural Beauty (AONB), and is part of the Hamstead Heritage Coast.

The area is also part of a  biological Site of Special Scientific Interest (SSSI). It was notified in 1951.

The villages of Newtown and Shalfleet lie close to its shore.

External links
 Information on Newtown River from a poor sailor
 Natural England entry
 Isle of Wight Council entry
IOW AONB map
English Nature SSSI citation sheet

Ports and harbours of the Isle of Wight
Rivers of the Isle of Wight
Estuaries of England
Nature reserves on the Isle of Wight
National nature reserves in England
Sites of Special Scientific Interest on the Isle of Wight